Mangbutu is a Central Sudanic language of northeastern Congo. It, or its speakers, are also known as Mangu-Ngutu, Mombuttu, Wambutu. The 1,200 Andinai are separated from other Mangbutu speakers by Lese; they speak a distinct dialect, as do the Andali tribe (Angwe dialect).

Mangbutu is spoken in Watsa Territory.

References

Central Sudanic languages
Languages of the Democratic Republic of the Congo